Sergeant Murphy is a 1938 American comedy film directed by B. Reeves Eason and written by Sy Bartlett and William Jacobs. The film stars Ronald Reagan, Mary Maguire, Donald Crisp, Ben Hendricks Jr. and William B. Davidson. The film was released by Warner Bros. on January 1, 1938.

Cast
 Ronald Reagan as Pvt. Dennis Reilley
 Mary Maguire as Miss Mary Lou Carruthers
 Donald Crisp as Col. Todd Carruthers
 Ben Hendricks Jr. as Cpl. Kane
 William B. Davidson as Maj. Gruff 
 Max Hoffman Jr. as Sgt. Buck Connors
 Robert Paige as Lt. Duncan
 Emmett Vogan as Maj. Smythe
 Tracy Layne as Texas 
 Edmund Cobb as Gruff's Adjutant
 Janet Shaw as Joan Furse 
 Rosella Towne as Alice Valentine
 Joan Valerie as Bess Merrill 
 Sam McDaniel as Henry H. Henry 
 Sergeant Murphy as Sergeant Murphy

See also
 Ronald Reagan filmography

References

External links
 

1938 films
1938 comedy films
American comedy films
American black-and-white films
Films directed by B. Reeves Eason
Warner Bros. films
1930s English-language films
1930s American films